"She's Playing Hard to Get" is a song performed by American contemporary R&B group Hi-Five, issued as the lead single from their second studio album, Keep It Goin' On. The song peaked at #5 on the Billboard Hot 100 in 1992. A cover of this song, entitled "He's Playing Hard to Get", was released by British girl group Solid Harmonie on their debut album, but was not released as a single.

Music video
The official music video for "She's Playing Hard to Get" was directed by Lionel C. Martin. Russell Neal does not appear in the video, as he left the group before the video was filmed.

Charts

References

External links
 
 
 

1992 singles
1992 songs
Hi-Five songs
Jive Records singles
Music videos directed by Lionel C. Martin
New jack swing songs